Miami Vice is a 2006 action crime film written, directed and co-produced by Michael Mann. An adaptation of the 1980s television series of the same name, on which Mann was an executive producer, it stars Colin Farrell as James "Sonny" Crockett and Jamie Foxx as Ricardo "Rico" Tubbs, MDPD detectives who go undercover to fight drug trafficking operations. The ensemble supporting cast includes Gong Li, Naomie Harris, Barry Shabaka Henley, John Ortiz, Luis Tosar, Ciarán Hinds, Elizabeth Rodriguez, John Hawkes, Justin Theroux, Isaach De Bankolé, Eddie Marsan and Tom Towles.

Foxx brought up the idea of a Miami Vice film to Mann during a party for Ali. This led Mann to revisit the series he co-produced. Like Collateral, which also starred Foxx, most of the film was shot with the Thomson Viper Filmstream Camera, while Super 35 was used for high-speed and underwater shots.

Miami Vice premiered in Los Angeles on July 20, 2006. It was released in the United States on July 28, 2006, and in Germany on August 24, 2006. It grossed $164.2 million worldwide on a reported $135 million budget. The film received mixed reviews, with praise for Mann's directing and visual style and criticism for the hard-edged storyline, though in subsequent years, its reputation among critics and filmmakers has grown, with critic Steven Hyden writing in 2016 that the film had become a cult favorite.

Plot
While working an undercover prostitute sting operation in a nightclub to arrest a pimp named Neptune, Miami-Dade Police detectives James "Sonny" Crockett and Ricardo "Rico" Tubbs receive a frantic phone call from their former informant Alonzo Stevens. Stevens reveals that he is leaving town, and, believing his wife Leonetta to be in immediate danger, asks Rico to check on her. Crockett learns that Stevens was working as an informant for the FBI but has been compromised.

Crockett and Tubbs quickly contact FBI Special Agent in Charge John Fujima and warn him about Stevens' safety. Tracking down Stevens through a vehicle transponder and aerial surveillance, Crockett and Tubbs stop him along I-95. Stevens reveals that a Colombian cartel had become aware that Russian undercovers (now dead) were working with the FBI, and had threatened to murder Leonetta via a C-4 necklace bomb if he did not confess. Rico, learning of Leonetta's death by telephone call, tells Alonzo that he does not have to go home. Hearing this, the grief-stricken Stevens commits suicide by walking in front of an oncoming semi truck.

En route to the murder scene, Sonny and Rico receive a call from Lt. Martin Castillo and are instructed to stay away. He tells them to meet him downtown, where they are introduced in person to Fujima, head of the Florida Joint Inter-Agency Task Force between the FBI, the DEA, and ICE. Crockett and Tubbs berate Fujima for the errors committed and inquire as to why the MDPD was not involved. Fujima reveals that the Colombian group part of the A.U.C. is highly sophisticated and run by José Yero, initially thought to be the cartel's leader. Fujima enlists Crockett and Tubbs, making them Organized Crime Drug Enforcement Task Force deputies, to lead a deep undercover operation. They continue the investigation by looking into go-fast boats coming from the Caribbean, delivering loads of narcotics from the Colombians. They then coerce their Miami informant contact Nicholas into setting up a meet-and-greet with the cartel.

Posing as highly skilled drug smugglers, Sonny and Rico offer their services to Yero, the cartel's security and intelligence man. After a high-tension meeting, they pass screening and are introduced to Arcángel de Jesús Montoya, transnational drug trafficking kingpin. In the course of their investigation, Crockett and Tubbs learn that the cartel is using the Aryan Brotherhood to distribute drugs, and is supplying them with state-of-the-art weaponry, which they had used to kill the Russian undercovers. Meanwhile, Crockett tries to gather further evidence from Montoya's financial adviser and lover, Isabella, but ends up starting a secret romance with her while on a trip by speedboat to Cuba. At a club, the two dance closely, observed by Yero. Afterwards, Crockett and Isabella discuss the possibility and impossibility of running away together. Tubbs begins to fear for the team's safety with Crockett's fling. Those fears are soon realized as Trudy, the unit's intelligence agent and Rico's girlfriend, is kidnapped by the Aryan Brotherhood on Yero's order, who never trusted Crockett and Tubbs. The Aryan Brotherhood demand for Crockett and Tubbs to deliver the cartel's load directly to them. With Lt. Castillo's help and clues given by Trudy, the unit triangulates Trudy's location to a mobile home in a trailer park and perform a rescue, but she is critically injured when Tubbs fails to evacuate her before a bomb is remotely detonated by Yero. Soon afterwards, Yero reveals Isabella's betrayal to Montoya and captures her. In the showdown, Crockett and Tubbs face off against Yero, his men, and the Aryan Brotherhood in a shipyard at the port of Miami.

During the firefight, Crockett begins to call in backup. When Isabella sees his police shield and radio, she realizes that he is a cop. Betrayed, Isabella wrestles with Crockett until he subdues her. Tubbs guns down Yero as he attempts to shoot his way to safety. After the gunfight, Crockett takes Isabella to a police safehouse and insists she will have to leave without him. Isabella tells him "time is luck," holding out hope the fling can continue, but he tells her they "have run out of time."

Crockett arranges for Isabella to leave the country and return home in Cuba, thus avoiding arrest. Meanwhile, Tubbs is keeping watch on Trudy in hospital as she begins to awaken from her coma.

Cast

Newly-created characters

 Gong Li as Isabella
 Luis Tosar as Arcángel de Jesús Montoya
 John Ortiz as José Yero
 Ciarán Hinds as FBI Agent John Fujima
 Isaach De Bankolé as 'Neptune'
 John Hawkes as Alonzo Stevens
 Tom Towles as Coleman
 Eddie Marsan as Nicholas
 Mario Ernesto Sánchez as El Tiburon
 Pasha D. Lychnikoff as Ivan
 Ana Cristina Oliveira as Bartender
 Oleg Taktarov as Security Man

Production

Development
Jamie Foxx brought up the idea of a Miami Vice film to Michael Mann during a party for Ali. This led Mann to revisit the series he helped create.

Like Collateral, which also starred Foxx, most of the film was shot with the Thomson Viper Filmstream Camera, while Super 35 was used for high-speed and underwater shots. Cinematographer Dion Beebe was also Collateral cinematographer.

The suits that Jamie Foxx wore in the film were designed by noted fashion designer Ozwald Boateng. He had worked with Foxx in the past and caught Mann's eye, who then asked him to work on the film. Michael Kaplan was responsible for the costume design overall.

Filming
The film was shot on location in the Caribbean, Uruguay, Paraguay (Ciudad del Este), and South Florida. Uruguay locations included the seaside resort Atlántida standing in for Havana, the old building of the Carrasco International Airport, and the Rambla waterfront avenue and the Old City in Montevideo. The production was characterized as being troubled, marked by a series of delays and conflicts. Seven days of filming were lost to hurricanes Katrina, Rita, and Wilma.  The delays led to a budget of what some insiders claimed to be over $150 million, though Universal Pictures says it cost $135 million. Several crew members criticized Mann's decisions during production, which featured sudden script changes, filming in unsafe weather conditions, and choosing locations that "even the police avoid, drafting gang members to work as security". Mann wanted the film to be as realistic as possible, and took Farrell along on what were thought to be real drug busts undertaken by FBI drug squads, though these were later found to have been staged.

Foxx was also characterized as unpleasant to work with. He had won an Academy Award after signing onto the film but before production began, and subsequently called for upgrades in his salary and other compensation. He demanded top billing in the film's credits and was also said to have complained that he was paid less than Farrell; Foxx's salary was raised considerably and Farrell's was cut slightly to address this. Foxx also refused to fly commercially, successfully lobbying Universal to hire a private jet for him. He also objected to filming scenes shot on boats or planes. Eventually, after gunshots were fired on set in the Dominican Republic on October 24, 2005, Foxx left the country and returned to the United States. This forced the production to abandon the script's intended ending, slated to be shot in Paraguay, and revert to a previously discarded one that Mann had written, which was set in Miami. One crew member later opined that the Miami-based ending was the dramatically inferior of the two, though Mann said that he came to prefer it.

Sal Magluta, the drug trafficker identified by Tubbs as running go-fast boats in the film's opening scenes, is in fact one of Miami's real-life reputed "Cocaine Cowboys" and is currently serving a life sentence for money laundering.

The first teaser trailer to appear for the film featured the Linkin Park and Jay-Z song "Numb/Encore". This trailer was attached to the release of King Kong in theaters. For several months before its release, the official web site hosted the first teaser trailer for download as a High-Definition WMV download.

Music
Mann took efforts to distance the film from the television series; this extended to his choices for music, as he declined to use the show's theme song and did not ask series composer Jan Hammer to work on the film's score. Hammer said, "I was completely surprised they didn't have a remake of [the theme]. I think it's a matter of being too cool for school." The musical score was composed by John Murphy, with additional cues by Klaus Badelt, Mark Batson and Tim Motzer.

Phil Collins' famous hit "In the Air Tonight", which was featured in the television series' pilot episode, is featured in the original film as a cover done by Miami-based rock band Nonpoint during the closing credits and on the soundtrack. Mann's "Director's Edit" released on DVD places the song in the film just prior to the climactic gun battle as suggested by members of the production crew during post-production.

 Nonpoint – "In the Air Tonight"
 Moby featuring Patti LaBelle – "One of These Mornings"
 Mogwai – "We're No Here"
 Nina Simone – "Sinnerman (Felix da Housecat's Heavenly House Mix)"
 Mogwai – "Auto Rock"
 Manzanita – "Arranca"
 India.Arie – "Ready for Love"
 Goldfrapp – "Strict Machine"
 Emilio Estefan – "Pennies in My Pocket"
 King Britt – "New World in My View"
 Blue Foundation – "Sweep"
 Moby – "Anthem"
 Freaky Chakra – "Blacklight Fantasy"
 John Murphy – "Mercado Nuevo"
 John Murphy – "Who Are You"
 King Britt & Tim Motzer – "Ramblas"
 Klaus Badelt & Mark Batson – "A-500"

The RZA was supposed to contribute to the film's score but dropped out for unknown reasons. Atlanta based producers Organized Noize were brought in to take RZA's place instead.

The music included on the soundtrack has several differences from what was featured in the film:
 Of the first four songs featured in the film's first sequence in The Mansion nightclub, three are on the soundtrack and Nina Simone's "Sinnerman" is the only song to be featured in its original form. Jay-Z and Linkin Park's "Numb/Encore" is not found on the soundtrack despite being featured in both of the film's trailers and being the first song in the film. Furthermore, the version of Goldfrapp's "Strict Machine" is the We Are Glitter remix of the song, and both it and Freaky Chakra's "Blacklight Fantasy" are edits from Sasha's mix album Fundacion NYC. Neither version appears on the soundtrack.
 Clips of two Audioslave songs, "Wide Awake" and "Shape of Things to Come", are featured in the film, but the songs do not appear on the soundtrack. This was possibly because the two songs were brand new and were set to be featured on Audioslave's new album Revelations, which had a release date close to the film.
 The version of Moby's "Anthem" on the soundtrack does not appear in the film. Instead, prominent placement is given to Moby's "Cinematic Version" of the song.
 King Britt's "New World in My View" is featured in the film but is missing the spoken-word lyrics of Sister Gertrude. The song plays instrumentally in the background at one point in the film.

Reception
Miami Vice opened at No. 1 in the United States, knocking Pirates of the Caribbean: Dead Man's Chest out of the number one position at the box office that weekend, after Pirates led the box office for almost a full month. In its opening weekend, the film grossed over $25.7 million at 3,021 theaters nationwide, with an average gross of $8,515 per theater. The film would go on to earn $63.5 million in Canada and the US. Miami Vice would fare better internationally. The film aired in 77 countries overseas, grossing $100,344,039 in its international run. Overall the film grossed $164 million worldwide against a reported $135 million budget.

Initial critical response 
On the film-review aggregator Rotten Tomatoes, Miami Vice holds a 47% approval rating based on 224 reviews, with an average rating of 5.7/10. The website's critical consensus reads: "Miami Vice is beautifully shot but the lead characters lack the charisma of their TV series counterparts, and the underdeveloped story is well below the standards of Michael Mann's better films." On Metacritic it holds a score of 66% based on 37 reviews, representing "generally favorable reviews".

It received positive notices from major publications including Rolling Stone, Empire, Variety, Newsweek, New York, The Village Voice, The Boston Globe, Entertainment Weekly, and film critic Richard Roeper on the television program Ebert & Roeper. The New York Times critic Manohla Dargis declared it "glorious entertainment" in her year-end wrap-up and praised its innovative use of digital photography.

The film received negative reviews from The Washington Post and the Los Angeles Times, focusing in part on comparisons with the 1980s series and on the plot.

It was included in the top ten of 2006 by Scott Foundas (LA Weekly) at #7, and by Manohla Dargis at #8. Additionally, in November 2009, the critics of Time Out New York named Miami Vice the 35th best film of the decade, saying:

Retrospective reviews 
In 2016, critic Steven Hyden wrote that Miami Vice had developed "a burgeoning reputation as a cult favorite, especially among younger critics and filmmakers who consider it a touchstone in their love of movies." Hyden wrote that the focus on "gloomy atmosphere and visual sensation" over plot and dialogue (much of which, he wrote, was "incomprehensible") made the film a visual meditation on "failure and futility" that was "one of the most expensive art films ever made." In Senses of Cinema, French director and critic  praised the film's digital aesthetic, extreme pace, and philosophical undertones; he called Miami Vice "a radical work that does not give up its author's formal and stylistic ambitions" and "an inspired synthesis of impressionism and hyper-realism," and said the film "has also just laid the foundations for a new order of action films."

Director Harmony Korine cited Miami Vice as a major influence on his 2012 film Spring Breakers. "The reason I love [Mann's] movies, and that movie in particular," Korine said, "is I could feel the place. When I watch that film, I don't even pay attention to what they're saying or the storyline. I love the colors, I love the texture."

Miami Vice was named the 95th best action film of all time in a 2014 Time Out poll of film critics, directors, actors and stunt actors.

Cast and crew response 
In subsequent years Michael Mann has made it clear that he considers Miami Vice to be the movie that "got away" — in large part because of the hastily revised ending. Speaking with New York magazine on the film's tenth anniversary, the director described his disappointment with the film: "I don't know how I feel about it. I know the ambition behind it, but it didn't fulfill that ambition for me because we couldn't shoot the real ending."

Colin Farrell was also not very fond of the movie: "I didn't like it so much — I thought it was style over substance and I accept a good bit of the responsibility. It was never going to be Lethal Weapon, but I think we missed an opportunity to have a friendship that also had some elements of fun."

Home media 
Miami Vice was released to DVD on December 12, 2006. It contained many extra features the theatrical version did not include, as well as an extended cut of the film itself, titled "the Director's Cut, with a running time of 140 minutes. It was one of the first HD DVD/DVD combo discs to be released by Universal Studios and one of the best-selling DVDs of 2006. It debuted in third place (behind Pirates of the Caribbean: Dead Man's Chest and Superman Returns) and managed to sell over a million copies in its first week alone. As of February 11, 2007, Miami Vice had grossed over $36.45 million in rentals.

On August 26, 2008, Universal Studios released the "Unrated Director's Edition" of Miami Vice on Blu-ray.

Video game 

A third-person shooter video game, Miami Vice: The Game, was released on July 18, 2006 as a tie-in to the film. It was developed by Rebellion Developments and published by Vivendi Universal Games, exclusively for the PlayStation Portable.

See also 

 List of films based on television programs

References

External links

 
 
 
 
 
 Miami Vice script
 Miami Vice soundtrack questions, answers and other information
 Thomson Viper Camera
 Miami Vice 2006 Movie Production Notes
Articles
 Miami Beach USA Miami Vice: Fashion Trend-Setter Again?
 Entertainment Weekly's cover story on the making of the film
 Interview: Michael Mann & The Cast Miami Vice
 Senses of Cinema essay

2006 films
American police detective films
German action films
Fictional portrayals of the Miami-Dade Police Department
Films about Colombian drug cartels
Films about the Federal Bureau of Investigation
Films about organized crime in the United States
Films based on television series
Films directed by Michael Mann
Films produced by Michael Mann
Films scored by John Murphy (composer)
Films set in Colombia
Films set in Havana
Films set in Miami
Films shot in Brazil
Films shot in California
Films shot in the Dominican Republic
Films shot in Havana
Films shot in Miami
Films shot in Paraguay
Films shot in Uruguay
Films with screenplays by Michael Mann
Miami Vice
Universal Pictures films
2000s English-language films
2000s American films
American buddy cop films
2000s German films